Sheila Raynor (15 March 190617 February 1998) was a British actress. She appeared in Jack Clayton's adaptation of Room at the Top. One of her notable roles was that of Alex's (Malcolm McDowell) mother in A Clockwork Orange.

She was married to the actor Keith Pyott.

Filmography

References

External links

1906 births
1998 deaths
Actresses from London
British stage actresses
British film actresses
British television actresses
20th-century British actresses
20th-century English women
20th-century English people